John Bucknell, known as Jack Bucknell, (7 June 1872 – 5 March 1925) was an English cricket player who played first-class cricket for Somerset between 1895 and 1905. He was born at Bedminster, Bristol and died at Darlington, Co Durham.

Bucknell was a right-handed lower-order batsman and a right-arm medium pace or leg-break bowler. His first-class cricket career was spasmodic, with three matches in each of the 1895, 1899 and 1905 seasons and a single game in 1904. His best bowling and batting performances were both achieved in his first season, 1895. In his first game, against Cambridge University, he took three Cambridge wickets for 93 runs. Then a week later, in the match against Oxford University he made 33, batting at No 10.

His brother Arthur played Minor Counties cricket for Durham.

References

1872 births
1925 deaths
English cricketers
Somerset cricketers
Durham cricketers